Nomada striata  is a Palearctic species of nomad bee.

References

External links
Images representing  Nomada striata 

Hymenoptera of Europe
Nomadinae
Insects described in 1793